Aristotelia serrata, commonly known as wineberry or in the Māori language makomako or just mako, is a small tree in the family Elaeocarpaceae, in the genus Aristotelia, found in the North Island, South Island and Stewart Island of New Zealand.

Description
Aristotelia serrata, also known as wineberry, is a small deciduous fast-growing tree or shrub. The tree can reach up to 10m tall, with a trunk diameter up to 30 cm. The bark is pale brown, smooth and patterned with flat lenticels. Branches are long, slender and spreading, branchlets have a reddish-brown color when pubescent.

Leaves
Aristotelia serrata leaves have distinguishable traits. Leaves are thin, deeply and sharply serrated, light or dark green on adaxial surface, often pinkish green on abaxial surface, veins distinct on both surfaces, size between 5-12 x 4–8 cm. The leaves, are disposed in opposite or subopposite pairs. They have drawn-out, pointed tips and prominent veins forming an obvious net-like vein pattern on both sides. The margins are strikingly toothed, with larger, narrowly pointed, irregular, jagged teeth bearing smaller teeth. Some trees have red-purple twigs and leaf undersides; others are just green. The leaves have long stalks, and each leaf stalk has a pair of small, narrow stipules, sometimes a few teeth, at its base. In the axils of the leafstalks are pointed buds, which can grow out into leafy shots or inflorescences.

Flowers

Flowers occur in an inflorescence of numerous cymes, flowers of all shades intermixed, coloured in cream through pink to dark red. Flowers has 4 to 6 mm diam; petals 3-lobed; stigma with 3-4 lobes; stamens numerous, arising from a glandular disc. Flower has 6–10 cm long, on slender pubescent pedicels with around 5-10mm long. Flowers have 4 ovate sepals around 3 mm long; 4 petals, 3-lobed, often deeply, 9mm long. Stamens occur on glandular disk, minutely pubescent. Ovary 3-4 celled, styles 3-4. The flowers are very numerous, in much-branched clusters. They have petals with rounded, incised lobes at the ends and look like small versions of  Elaeocarpus flowers. They are almost colourless when they open; then they change to pink, red, and dark red, providing a colorful display. Wineberry has male and female flowers on different plants, with some bisexual flowers among the males. Female flowers are borne in large panicles, on short shoots just above leaves or old leaf scars, on 2 year old wood of the upper leafy branchlets.

Fruits
The fruit is a berry that is 4-5mm in diameter, black, containing 8 angular seeds. With 4 locules and axile placentation. They are red through dark red to almost black.

Distribution

New Zealand range
Endemic to New Zealand, wineberry is found throughout the South Island of New Zealand and lower North Island. It is common in moist forest and scrub land within the lowland, montane, and subalpine climates. Wineberry can also be found on Stewart Island.

Habitat preferences
Taking advantage of ecological disturbances such as natural tree falls A. serrata is plentiful in regenerating forest and damp river margins. Forest clearings which are followed by the colonization of wineberry are often due to land slip, storm damage, natural tree fall, forest clearings, and forest fire.

Life cycle/Phenology
Wineberry is a quick growing deciduous tree. Gradually losing leaves during the winter it may become fully bare prior to new leaves and flower development in spring. Wineberry is an attractive tree, with pinkish foliage and rose coloured flowers in the spring. Berries ripen in the summer. As the flowers of the Wineberry mature they turn from white to red, there are both female and male flowers on different plants with some bisexual flowers among the males.

Predators, parasites, and diseases
Wineberry acts as a host to numerous associated plant species and is fed on by native birds and insects. Associated plants include a range of mosses to herbaceous plants such as Orthotrichum cyathiforme, Orthotrichum calvum, Macroacoma tenue, Leptophyllopsis laxa, and Lleostylus micranthus. The berries of A. serrata are susceptible to frugivory by both birds and mammals. Kererū are known to feed on the fruit of wineberry. In order to conserve kererū populations it is suggested by the Department of Conservation that wineberry be planted as a food source.  The berries of the wineberry are not the only parts eaten: kawakawa looper (Cleora scriptaria) larvae can be found feeding on its leaves.

Cultural uses
Aristotelia serrata has a multitude of uses by both European settlers and Māori. Māori used makomako medicinally by boiling its leaves as an application to burns and infected wounds. The berries serve as food and are often eaten by children, and can be squeezed to make a thick sweet drink. Wineberry can be used in a variety of way to create dyes: the plant contains tannins, and the bark can provide a blue-black dye. European settlers burnt the shoots of the wineberry, changing the wood to charcoal for the production of gunpowder.

Interesting facts

Ecology
Often form thickets after felling of forest.

Nomenclature
Aristotelia means after Aristotle, the Greek philosopher.

Systematic botany

There may exist two varieties for the same species, one with light green leaves and bright red fruits, and the other with dark green leaves, purplish below and dark fruits.

References

External links

 Map showing citizen scientist observations from NaturewatchNZ

serrata
Trees of New Zealand
Endemic flora of New Zealand
Edible fruits
New Zealand fruit